The Defense Intelligence Agency Memorial Wall, commonly known as the Patriots Memorial, is a memorial at DIA Headquarters in Washington, D.C., dedicated to those agency employees who lost their lives in the line of their intelligence work and whose deaths are not classified.

History and description
The wall was first dedicated on 14 December 1988 by Director Leonard Perroots at the DIA Headquarters, honoring those DIA personnel "who died in the service of the United States". It "commemorates the profound individual sacrifices made on behalf of the United States by DIA members and acts as a reminder of the selflessness, dedication, and courage required to confront national challenges..."

Criteria for inclusion
The DIA does not provide detailed criteria on who is eligible for inclusion on the memorial. The wall is presumably not exhaustive due to omission of DIA personnel with links to classified missions, such as DIA officer Charles Dennis McKee, who died as a result of the Lockerbie bombing. McKee is notably absent on the DIA wall, whereas his CIA partner Matthew Gannon is honored on the CIA Memorial Wall. The majority of the disclosed DIA fatalities are either a result of terrorist attacks or accidents and acts of violence directed against overt employees. While CIA has a practice of marking the deaths of its private contractors on its memorial wall, the number of DIA contractor losses, if any, is unknown.

Controversy in counting personnel
Unlike the more expansive memorial at the DIA's fellow defense agency the NSA – which includes members of all military elements operating on behalf of or assigned to the NSA – the DIA's interpretation of "personnel" and what it means to die in the line of duty has remained opaque to the public. During Operation Babylift, the U.S. Defense Attache Office (DAO), a branch of the DIA, lost 35 personnel, but of these the DIA included only five individuals on its memorial wall, excluding the remaining 30 deaths of DAO staff. This type of unclear accounting led to some controversy before the DIA memorial was even created. In 1983, American citizen Jim Poulton threatened to sue the U.S. government for records after repeatedly failing to confirm whether his parents Orin Poulton and June Poulton, who perished during Operation Babylift, were DIA employees. Following years of wrangling, it was revealed that Orin, although working for the DIA's Defense Attache Office at the time, was actually being paid by the U.S. Navy, and as such was not considered a member DIA personnel for bookkeeping purposes. Similarly, June Poulton was a civilian paid by the U.S. Army. Kenneth E. Geisen, the DIA spokesperson at the time, said "I'm not denying it. I'm not confirming it...DIA would have no reason to cover up anything". When asked about honoring these civilians on war memorials, the DIA spokesperson said that "Well, [dying while] coming back on an airplane [during the Vietnam War] is just like getting killed on the Beltway here in a car accident". The Poulton family was billed thousands of dollars for coffins and transportation for the bodies of Orin and June, but they refused to pay; in the end, the government did not insist on payment.

References

Defense Intelligence Agency
Monuments and memorials in Washington, D.C.
Buildings and structures completed in 1988